Cyprus has entered the Junior Eurovision Song Contest ten times since debuting at the first contest in 2003 with Theodora Rafti and the song "Mia efhi". They were forced to withdraw in 2005, as Rena Kiriakidi's "Tsirko" was said to be too similar to another song. However, the Cypriot viewers were able to watch the show and vote.

In May 2007, CyBC were announced by the EBU to host the Junior Eurovision Song Contest 2008. They hosted it at the 'Spyros Kyprianou' Athletic Centre in Lemesos on 22 November 2008.

The country's best result is an eighth place achieved both at the 2004 and 2006 contests with Marios Tofi and the song "Oneira" and Louis Panagiotou and Christina Christofi and the song "Agoria koritsia" respectively.

History
Cyprus withdrew from the competition in 2010 because of unspecified reasons. Although they were in talks with the EBU to return to the contest in 2013, they eventually did not. On 3 July 2014, CyBC announced its return to the competition after a four-year absence, despite withdrawing from the adult contest earlier that year. They were represented by Sophia Patsalides with the song "I pio omorfi mera" which finished in ninth place out of sixteen participating entries, despite being one of the favourites to win the contest that year. Although they withdrew from the contest in 2015 for financial reasons, Cyprus returned in 2016, only to place in the bottom two twice, second-to-last in 2016 with George Michaelides and the song 'Dance Floor' in Valletta, Malta and last in 2017 with Nicole Nicolaou and the song "I Wanna Be a Star" in Tbilisi, Georgia which is the country's worst result in the contest.

Participation overview

Commentators and spokespersons

The contests are broadcast online worldwide through the official Junior Eurovision Song Contest website junioreurovision.tv and YouTube. In 2015, the online broadcasts featured commentary in English by junioreurovision.tv editor Luke Fisher and 2011 Bulgarian Junior Eurovision Song Contest entrant Ivan Ivanov. The Cypriot broadcaster, CyBC, sent their own commentator to each contest in order to provide commentary in the Greek language and English languages. Spokespersons were also chosen by the national broadcaster in order to announce the awarding points from Cyprus. The table below list the details of each commentator and spokesperson since 2003.

Hostings

See also
Cyprus in the Eurovision Song Contest
Cyprus in the Eurovision Young Dancers
Cyprus in the Eurovision Young Musicians

Notes and references

Notes

References

 
Countries in the Junior Eurovision Song Contest